Chloe Susan Arthur (born 21 January 1995) is a Scottish footballer who plays as a midfielder for Crystal Palace in the FA Women's Championship and the Scotland national team.

Club career
Arthur broke into the Celtic first team aged 17, coming through the club's Youth Academy. In December 2014, Arthur transferred together with Heather Richards from Celtic to Hibernian, where she was part of the team that reached the Scottish Cup final and finished second in the league.

In January 2016, after a year in Edinburgh, she joined Bristol City in the FA WSL 2. On 14 February, she scored on her Bristol debut in a 7–1 win against Queens Park Rangers in the FA Cup. She finished her first season at the club with three goals in 20 appearances. On 8 February 2017, Bristol announced that Arthur had signed new deal with the club. She finished her second season with two goals in 8 appearances. In July 2017, she signed a new contract with the Vixens.

On 25 July 2018, Arthur joined Birmingham City on a two-year deal.

Arthur joined Aston Villa, who had just been promoted tot he WSL, in July 2020. She was released by Villa during the summer of 2022 and then signed for Championship club Crystal Palace.

International career

Arthur represented Scotland at under-17 and under-19 levels.

On 8 February 2015, she made her senior debut for Scotland, coming on as a 63rd-minute substitute for Fiona Brown in a 4–0 win against Northern Ireland. Arthur was named in the Scotland squads for both Euro 2017 and the 2019 World Cup, their first appearances in the final stages of those tournaments.

She scored her first goals for Scotland in a 7–1 win against the Faroe Islands on 21 September 2021.

Personal life
Her father Gary was one of ten people killed when a police helicopter crashed into the Clutha Bar, Glasgow, in November 2013.

References

External links 
 Chloe Arthur at UEFA.com
 Chloe Arthur at Soccerway
 Chloe Arthur at Scottish Football Association
 Chloe Arthur at Bristol City

1995 births
Living people
Scottish women's footballers
Scotland women's international footballers
Celtic F.C. Women players
Hibernian W.F.C. players
Bristol Academy W.F.C. players
Birmingham City W.F.C. players
Women's Super League players
Women's association football midfielders
Footballers from Renfrewshire
People from Erskine
2019 FIFA Women's World Cup players
Aston Villa W.F.C. players
UEFA Women's Euro 2017 players